Constantin Popescu (3 September 1928 – 2 November 2018), nicknamed Pilică, was a Romanian professional handball manager and author of books on handball. He is the most successful coach in the history of Romanian female handball. He had pioneered handball in Romania. He graduated from the I.E.F.S., being the disciple of Professor Victor Cojocaru.

International honours 
World Championship:
Gold Medalist: 1956, 1960, 1962
Silver Medalist: 1973

European Champions Cup:
Winner: 1961

IHF Cup:
Winner: 1984

City Cup:
Winner: 2000

References

 
  
1928 births
2018 deaths
Sportspeople from Bucharest
Romanian handball coaches 
Romanian sportswriters